Born in Port-au-Prince, Haiti, Jean Ronald Cornely grew up at the corner of Capois and Audain (now Avenue Jean Paul II) streets with his four brothers and two sisters. He learned the value of hard work at a young age and applied this perseverance and team spirit to many sporting activities he was involved in, including athletics such as volleyball and football. He completed his classical studies at the Petit Séminaire Collège Saint-Martial and the Georges Marc Institute, where he was among the best in his class. His academic excellence, combined with his leadership capabilities, enabled him to easily enter the Faculty of Medicine and Port-au-Prince Pharmacy, where he graduated as a Doctor of Medicine.

He spent his first postgraduate year in the northwest of the country, then spent time in Jean-Rabel and Bombardopolis, and eventually in the Artibonite Valley as Medical Director of ODVA (Development Agency of the Valley of Artibonite). He then returned to the Hospital of the State University of Haiti for his specialization in Obstetrics and Gynecology. There he became a Medical Assistant in record time.

Shortly after this time, Cornely attended a fertility treatment in pair formation at Johns Hopkins Hospital in Maryland. Always eager to learn new skills, Cornely then decided to specialize in gynecological oncology at the Institut Curie in Paris. Back in Haiti, he was in charge of gynecologic oncology at the Hospital of the University of State of Haiti. Soon after, he was appointed General Manager of the hospital, then transferred with the same title to coordinate the implementation of the National Radiotherapy Centre Chemotherapy and nuclear medicine. He still holds this position to date, and also heads the cancer program of the Ministry of Public Health and Population (MSPP).

Cornely teaches anatomy and gynecologic oncology in several disciplines of medicine and nursing. He is also responsible for the Restoration Project of Radiotherapy in Haiti.

References

http://www.haiti-renaissance.com/qui-suis-je-.html*

Year of birth missing (living people)
Living people
People from Port-au-Prince
Haitian obstetricians and gynaecologists